

Akademiese personneel en vakke

 HLP van Zyl- Rekeningkunde
 EJ Barrett- Engels en Sesotho
 R Bauling- Fisiese Wetenskap
 A Bekker- Lewensoriëntering en deeltyds Meganiese Tegnologie
 M Bekker- Kuns en Verbruikerstudies
 M Hanekom- Afrikaans
 R Burger- Afrikaans
 SJ Cremer- Tegnologie, Siviele Tegnologie en Ingenieurs Grafika en Ontwerp
 B da Silva- Lewensoriëntering en Engels
 R Erwee- Natuurwetenskap, Wiskunde en Fisiese Wetenskap
 R du Toit- Engels
 Le Roux- Ekonomiese Bestuurswetenskap en Besigheidstudies
 S Eksteen- Wiskunde
 D Erwee- Ingenieurs Grafika en Ontwerp
 CJ Ferreira- Lewensoriëntering
 J Grobbelaar- Wiskunde
 J Hanekom- Tegniese Tekeninge en Wiskundige Geletterdheid
 H Kotze- Natuurwetenskap en Lewenswetenskap
 D Litch- Tegnologie, Elektriese Tegnologie en Tegniese Wetenskap
 C Marais- Afrikaans
 CJ Nel- Engels, Geskiedenis en Toerisme
 R Niemann- Aardrykskunde
 J Pelser- Afrikaans
 P Pelser- Tegnologie en Meganiese Tegnologie
 M Pretorius- Wiskunde, Tegniese Wiskunde en Wiskundige Geletterdheid
 Faure- Ekonomiese Bestuurswetenskap en Rekeningkunde
 C Tubb- Tik en Rekenaar Toepassings Tegnologie
 J van Niekerk- Lewensoriëntering en Landbouwetenskap
 S van Schalkwyk- Natuurwetenskap en Lewenswetenskap
 Von Maltitz (deeltyds)- Engels
 R Humphreys (deeltyds)- Engels
 M da Silva (deeltyds)- Lewensoriëntering

Verteenwoordigende Raad van Leerders (2016)

President
 Theo van Niekerk
 Gretha Olivier

Vise-president
 Christopher Forster
 Cecile Bester

Addisionele lede

Graad 12

Seuns
 Athenkosi Konza
 Marco de Jesus
 Ranny Nolan
 Fazil Memon

Vihvuxcjobvxyionxu

Graad 11

Seuns
 Shayan Yusuf
 Awais Osman
 Tiaan Venter

Meisies
 Leonora Grobbelaar
 Mpumi Magugwana
 Riane de Koker
 Amina Moosa

Graad 10

Seuns
 Ruan Schoeman
 Devon Vries
 Mudassir Sayed

Meisies
 Leandri Grobler
 Yocke Barnard
 Hillary Osunde

Graad 9

Seuns
 Saad Yusuf
 Yaaseen Moosa

Meisies
 Safiyya Basadien
 Simone Bonthuyzen

Algemene univorm

Seuns
 Wit lang of kort hemp
 Skool trui (opsioneel)
 Skool baadjie (opsioneel)
 Skool das
 Grys lang broek
 Grys kouse
 Swart leer of valse leer skoene

Meisies
 Skool rok
 Skool trui (opsioneel)
 Skool baadjie (opsioneel)
 Wit kouse
 Swart skool skoene

OF

 Wit lang of kort hemp
 Skool trui (opsioneel)
 Skool baadjie (opsioneel)
 Skool das
 Blou skoolbroek
 Wit kouse
 Swart skool skoene

Buitemuurse aktiwiteite

Sport
 Rugby
 Tennis
 Gholf
 Sokker
 Krieket
 Hokkie
 Netbal
 Swem
 Landloop
 Perdry
 Skiet
 Tweekamp
 Hardloop
 Stap
 Verspring
 Hoogspring
 Gewigstoot
 Spiesgooi
 Werpskyf
 Skaak

Kulturele aktiwiteite
 Voortrekkers
 Dans
 Drama
 Glee
 VCSV
 Debat
 Redenaars

Eksterne skakels
 Ficksburg High School Website

Schools in the Free State (province)